Keith Eshman is a former professional rugby league footballer who played for the Wests Tigers. He played his junior rugby league for Quakers Hill Destroyers and was educated at Patrician Brothers' College, Blacktown.

References

External links
NRL profile

Australian rugby league players
Wests Tigers players
Balmain Ryde-Eastwood Tigers players
Living people
1987 births
Place of birth missing (living people)
Rugby league wingers